Tanbang Station is a station of the Daejeon Metro Line 1 in Tanbang-dong, Seo District, Daejeon, South Korea.

External links
  Tanbang Station from Daejeon Metropolitan Express Transit Corporation

Daejeon Metro stations
Seo District, Daejeon
Railway stations opened in 2006